Neolebouria is a genus of trematodes in the family Opecoelidae.

Species
Neolebouria acanthogobii (Yamaguti, 1951) Gibson, 1976
Neolebouria antarctica (Szidat & Graefe, 1967) Zdzitowiecki, 1990
Neolebouria georgenascimentoi Bray, 2002
Neolebouria georgiensis Gibson, 1976
Neolebouria lanceolata (Price, 1934) Reimer, 1987
Neolebouria leiognathi (Wang, Wang & Zhang, 1992) Bray, 2002
Neolebouria lobata (Yamaguti, 1934) [emend. Manter, 1947] Gibson, 1976
Neolebouria maorum (Allison, 1966) Gibson, 1976
Neolebouria merretti Gibson & Bray, 1982
Neolebouria pentacerotis Machida & Araki, 2002
Neolebouria terranovaensis Zdzitowiecki, Pisano & Vacchi, 1993
Neolebouria tinkerbellae Thompson & Margolis, 1987
Neolebouria tohei (Yamaguti, 1970) Gibson, 1976 [emend. Bartoli, Bray & Gibson, 2003] emend. Martin, Cutmore & Cribb, 2017

References

Opecoelidae
Trematode genera